Suvreen Guggal – Topper of The Year is an Indian TV drama series that aired on Channel V India. It is the fourth television series of 4 Lions Films. The program premiered on 19 March 2012.

Plot

Season I
Topper of the Year is an inspiring, rousing coming of age tale of a generation of youngsters studying at DPSC (Devendra Pratap Singh College), a prestigious college in Delhi. It's a humorous and riveting campus drama that states that there's more to this Facebook generation than iPod and low-waist jeans. It showcases how Suvreen faces difficulties and finally becomes a fashion designer.

Season II
Season 2 follows how Suvreen leaves her home, struggles and finds a foothold in the fashion industry. She is still not so established, but she still faces many problems in different fields while trying to make a mark. She also adopts the name Pepper Pathak and runs her own brand, hiding it from everyone except her boyfriend Yuvraj and roommate Soni. The story showcases how she solves all her problems, maintains a balance between her home and work and tries to make everyone happy, including her parents, boyfriend and friends. She goes to Paris for her four-year course. She returns to Kathgodam, India and opens her own boutique. On the day of the inauguration, Yuvraj proposes marriage, and she happily accepts.

Cast
 Smriti Kalra as Suvreen Guggal (Suvi)
 Shivin Narang as Yuvraj (Yuvi) Singh
 Karam Rajpal as Samar Raghuvanshi
 Sadhana Sharma as Sakshi Singh, Yuvi's sister
 Heli Daruwala as Alisha Deewan
 Mohit Malik as Rehan Charles
 Vartika Chauhan as Amanpreet Sehgal
 Karishma Rawat as Naro
 Vibhu K Raghave as Rohan
 Abhishek Sharma (Actor) as Raathi
 Raghu Raja Bhatia as Mannu
 Viren Vazirani as Vivaan
 Akshay Anand as Baldev Guggal
 Ekta Sharma as Lovely Guggal
 Mansi Srivastava Jasleen Guggal
 Shuhaib Embichi As  Ex-Aneesh Nayar
 Disha Thakur as Tultuli
 Simple Kaul as Ira Shawhney
 Praneet Bhat as Jolly
 Sonia Balani as Sony Chadha
 Hitesh Bharadwaj as Zorro
 Riney Aryaa as Riya

References

External links

Channel V India original programming
Indian drama television series
Hindi-language television shows
2012 Indian television series debuts
2013 Indian television series endings
Indian teen drama television series
Television series by 4 Lions Films
Television shows set in Delhi